Harald William Baker (29 September 1882 – 17 October 1962) was a rugby union player who represented Australia.

Baker, a flanker, was born in Paddington, New South Wales and claimed three international rugby caps for Australia. He was the brother of the multi-talented Australian sporting star Snowy Baker.

Baker and Jimmy Clarken are remembered for their heroic rescues in the Coogee surf disaster of 28 January 1911. In this context his name is often found misspelled as "Harold Baker".

References
Howell, Max (2005) Born to Lead – Wallaby Test Captains, Celebrity Books, Auckland NZ

Australian rugby union players
Australia international rugby union players
1882 births
1962 deaths
Rugby union flankers
Rugby union players from Sydney